Paulinów  is a village in the administrative district of Gmina Sterdyń, within Sokołów County, Masovian Voivodeship, in east-central Poland.

During WWII, several people in the village helped to hide Jews. The Germans used a Jewish agent to pose as an escapee looking for a hiding place with a Polish family, after receiving help the agent denounced the Polish family to the Germans, resulting in the deaths of 12 Poles and several Jews who were hiding with the family.

References

Villages in Sokołów County